Michael Smith (born August 9, 1988) is a former American football running back. He was drafted by the Tampa Bay Buccaneers in the seventh round of the 2012 NFL Draft. He played college football at Utah State.

Professional career

Tampa Bay Buccaneers
Smith was drafted in the seventh round of the 2012 NFL Draft by the Tampa Bay Buccaneers. On May 7, 2012, Smith signed a four-year deal with the Bucs to officially join the Buccaneers roster. The deal was worth $2.165 million over four years and included a $66,000 signing bonus.

New York Jets
Smith signed a one-year contract with the New York Jets on August 1, 2014. He was released on August 23.

References

External links
Tampa Bay Buccaneers bio
Utah State Aggies bio

1988 births
Living people
American football running backs
Utah State Aggies football players
Tampa Bay Buccaneers players
New York Jets players
Players of American football from Tucson, Arizona